The 2008–09 Premier Academy League Under–18 season was the twelfth edition since the establishment of The Premier Academy League, and the fifth under the current make-up. The first matches of the season were played on 23 August 2008, and the season ended on 18 May 2009.

All teams played the other teams in their group twice and played 10 inter-group fixtures, producing 28 games a season. Eight of the inter-group games were played against teams in their 'paired group' (i.e. A–B and C–D are the paired groups), whilst the remaining two games comprise one game against a team in each of the two remaining groups. Winners of each group qualified for play-offs.

Arsenal became the first group winners by leading Crystal Palace 20 points with 6 games left in Group A after a 1–0 win against Watford on 21 March 2009. Group C champions Manchester City set up tie with Arsenal in the play-off the following week by recording a 23–game unbeaten run which last to 26 games. Sunderland secured top spot in Group D after achieving the 14th win in last 15 games on 31 March. These 3 teams all clinched the group title for a third successive season. Tottenham Hotspur claimed the last play-off spot after beating Watford 2–1 on 6 May.

Arsenal reached the 2009 Premier Academy League Play-off Final with a 2–1 victory over Manchester City at the City of Manchester Stadium on 8 May. Tottenham Hotspur set up clash with Arsenal after defeating Sunderland 2–1 at the Stadium of Light on 13 May.

On 17 May, Arsenal were crowned the 2008–09 Premier Academy League Champions after a 1–0 win against Tottenham Hotspur in the Play-off Final at White Hart Lane, with a goal from Rhys Murphy. It is Arsenal's first title since the Premier Academy League reformed as an under–18 competition.

League tables

Academy Group A

Academy Group B

Academy Group C

Academy Group D 

Rules for classification: 1st points; 2nd goal difference; 3rd goals scoredPos = Position; Pld = Matches played; W = Matches won; D = Matches drawn; L = Matches lost; GF = Goals for; GA = Goals against; GD = Goal difference; Pts = PointsC = Champions

Play-off semi-finals

Play-off Final

Records 
 Most group wins: 22, Arsenal, Manchester City and Sunderland
 Most league wins: 24, Arsenal
 Fewest wins: 3, Milton Keynes Dons
 Fewest group defeats: 0, Manchester City
 Fewest league defeats: 1, Manchester City
 Most defeats: 21, Milton Keynes Dons
 Most points: 72, Manchester City
 Fewest points: 13, Milton Keynes Dons
 Most goals scored: 90, Leicester City
 Fewest goals scored: 26, Milton Keynes Dons
 Fewest group goals conceded: 30, Sunderland
 Fewest league goals conceded: 32, Arsenal and Sunderland
 Most goals conceded: 81, Milton Keynes Dons
 Highest goal difference: 55, Manchester City
 Lowest goal difference: −55, Milton Keynes Dons

See also 
 Premier Reserve League 2008–09
 FA Youth Cup 2008–09
 Premier League 2008–09
 2008–09 in English football

External links 
 Premier Academy League U18 2008/2009 final league tables
 Premier Academy League U18 2008/2009 results

Match reports 

2008-09
Acad
Academy